"Love Is Like a Spinning Wheel" is a single by American country music artist Jan Howard. Released in November 1971, the song reached #36 on the Billboard Hot Country Singles chart. The single was later released on Howard's 1972 album of the same name. The song became Howard's first solo top forty single in two years. The song became a major hit in Canada, peaking at #14 on the Canadian RPM Country Tracks chart, her last solo single to chart in Canada.

Chart performance

References 

1971 singles
Jan Howard songs
Song recordings produced by Owen Bradley
1971 songs
Songs written by Sergio Endrigo
Decca Records singles